Richard Harcourt (March 17, 1849 – November 29, 1932) was a Canadian lawyer, judge, and politician. He served as a member of the Legislative Assembly of Ontario for the riding of Monck from 1879 to 1908. He was Ontario's treasurer from 1890 to 1899.

He was born in Seneca Township, Haldimand County, Canada West in 1849, the son of Michael Harcourt who was a member of the parliament for the Province of Canada and studied at the University of Toronto. He was principal of Cayuga High School and served as inspector of schools in Haldimand County from 1871 to 1876, also studying law during that period. In 1876, he married Augusta H. Young, was called to the bar in the same year and set up practice in Welland. Harcourt served as deputy judge in Welland County in 1886. In 1890, he was named Queen's Counsel. He also served as inspector of schools for Welland and the town of Niagara Falls. He died in Welland in 1932.

References 

The Canadian parliamentary companion, 1889, JA Gemmill
 
Excerpt from Ontario Canada Deaths, 1869-1932 (Welland, Welland County, Ontario; 1932) at site Ancestors of Karyn Van Kainen

1849 births
1932 deaths
Canadian King's Counsel
Finance ministers of Ontario
Ontario Liberal Party MPPs
University of Toronto alumni